Events from the year 1931 in France.

Incumbents
President: Gaston Doumergue (until 13 June), Paul Doumer (starting 13 June)
President of the Council of Ministers: Theodore Steeg (until 27 January), Pierre Laval (starting 27 January)

Events
27 January – Pierre Laval forms a government in France.
6 May – Paris Colonial Exposition opens.
13 May – Paul Doumer elected president of France.
14 June – Overloaded pleasure craft Saint-Philibert, carrying trippers home to Nantes from Île de Noirmoutier, sinks at the mouth of the river Loire and over 450 drown.
8 November- French police launch a large scale raid against Corsican bandits.

Births

January to June
7 February – Serge Danot, animator (died 1991)
26 February – Jacques Rouxel, animator (died 2004)
6 March – Nicolas Barone, cyclist (died 2003)
3 June – Jean Bouise, actor (died 1989)
5 June – Jacques Demy, film director (died 1990)
30 June – Joseph Thomin, racing cyclist (died 2018)

July to December
1 July – Leslie Caron, actress
3 July – Claude-Henri Chouard, surgeon
4 July – Sébastien Japrisot, author, screenwriter and film director (died 2003)
6 July – Louis Mexandeau, politician
24 July – Éric Tabarly, sailor (died 1998)
23 August – Coccinelle, transsexual actress and entertainer (died 2006)
11 October – Minou Petrowski, film critic and animator (died 2021)
13 October – Raymond Kopa, footballer (died 2017)
25 October – Annie Girardot, actress (died 2011)
6 November – André Trochut, cyclist (died 1996)
12 December – Christian Metz, film theorist (died 1993)
18 December – André S. Labarthe, French actor (died 2018)
28 December – Guy Debord, Marxist theorist, writer and filmmaker (died 1994)

Deaths
1 February – Emmanuel d'Orléans, noble from the House of Orléans (born 1872)
4 February – Dominique-Marie Gauchet, admiral (born 1853)
31 March – Henri Béraldi, bibliophile and publisher (born 1849)
7 May – Anne Boutiaut Poulard, cook (born 1851)
22 June – Armand Fallières, politician and President of France (born 1841)
11 July – Jean-Louis Forain, Impressionist artist (born 1852)
7 November – Étienne Bazeries, military cryptanalyst (born 1846)
2 December – Vincent d'Indy, composer (born 1851)
Full date unknown – Alexandre Darracq, automobile manufacturer (born 1855)

See also
 Interwar France

References

Links

1930s in France